Vancouver Quadra is a federal electoral district in the Metro Vancouver region of British Columbia, Canada. It has been represented in the House of Commons of Canada since 1949. The constituency bears the name of the Spanish explorer who surveyed the area in 1775, Juan Francisco de la Bodega y Quadra.  Since 2007, the riding has been represented by Liberal MP Joyce Murray, who has served in the 29th ministry under Prime Minister of Canada Justin Trudeau.

Within the boundaries of this riding are the University of British Columbia and the western portions of the affluent West Side of Vancouver. Voters within Vancouver Quadra have tended to elect centrist candidates, which is an exception to the province as a whole where politics has tended to be more polarized. Though the Liberals have held the seat since 1984, MPs tend to be on the right wing of the party. For example, the current MP, Joyce Murray, was previously a cabinet minister in the centre-right British Columbia Liberal Party, which is unaffiliated with the federal Liberal party and attracts the vast majority of voters who vote for the Conservative Party of Canada in federal elections.

Demographics

This is the sixth wealthiest riding in Canada, with an average family income of over $145,000. As of 2006, this riding had 37% immigrants, most of whom are Chinese-Canadians. The province's largest university, the University of British Columbia, is situated in this riding. The major employer is the professional, scientific and technical service sector. The unemployment rate is 5.2%. Nearly every single-family house in this riding is worth over a million dollars; the median house value is over 2 million dollars.

The Vancouver Quadra riding has a very high level of educational attainment; it has the highest percentage of people with a university certificate or degree in all of Canada (53.1%) and also tops the following educational attainment sub-categories:

 Earned doctorate: 4.7%
 Degree in medicine, dentistry, veterinary medicine or optometry: 2.5%
 Bachelor's degree: 27.4%

According to the Canada 2016 Census:

Languages: 66.0% English, 1.6% French, 31.3% Other, 1.1% Multiple languages 
Religions: 27.9% Protestant, 16.3% Catholic, 4.5% Buddhist, 4.2% Other Christian, 3.8% Jewish, 2.4% Christian Orthodox, 1.1% Muslim, 38.5% No religious affiliation 
Average income: $46,991

Geography
The district includes the parts of the West Side of Vancouver and the University of British Columbia Endowment Lands.

History
The electoral district was created in 1947 from Vancouver East and Vancouver South ridings.  It was a swing riding for most of its first four decades.  However, in 1984, John Turner, then Prime Minister, unseated Progressive Conservative incumbent Bill Clarke even as Turner's Liberals suffered what was then the biggest seat loss in Canadian history.  It was one of only two Liberal-held seats west of Ontario.  The seat has stayed in Liberal hands ever since.

The 2012 federal electoral boundaries redistribution concluded that the electoral boundaries of Vancouver Quadra should be adjusted, and a modified electoral district of the same name will be contested in future elections. The redefined Vancouver Quadra loses a portion of its current territory east of the Arbutus Corridor to the new district of Vancouver Granville. These new boundaries were legally defined in the 2013 representation order, which came into effect upon the call of the 42nd Canadian federal election, scheduled for October 2015.

Members of Parliament
This riding has elected the following Members of Parliament:

Current Member of Parliament

Its Member of Parliament (MP) is Joyce Murray, (Liberal) a former British Columbia cabinet minister and provincial Member of the Legislative Assembly. She was first elected in a March 2008 by-election, by a small margin. Murray was re-elected in the general elections of 2008, 2011 and 2015 with larger margins. She was again re-elected in the 2019 and 2021 federal elections, albeit by reduced margins.

Election results

See also
 List of Canadian federal electoral districts
 Past Canadian electoral districts

References

 Expenditures – 2004
 Expenditures – 2000
 Expenditures – 1997
 Riding history from the Library of Parliament

Notes

Politics of Vancouver
British Columbia federal electoral districts
University Endowment Lands
Federal electoral districts in Greater Vancouver and the Fraser Valley
1947 establishments in British Columbia